"Symphony 2000" is the lead single released from EPMD's sixth album, Out of Business. The song was produced by Erick Sermon and featured verses from EPMD's labelmates, Method Man & Redman and Lady Luck. "Symphony 2000" was EPMD's last charting single making it to the R&B and rap charts.

The song sampled the famous main title song from the movie Uccellacci e Uccellini, directed by italian director Pier Paolo Pasolini and composed by Ennio Morricone. The song was sung by Italian actor and singer Domenico Modugno.

Single track listing
"Symphony 2000" (Radio Edit)
"Symphony 2000" (LP Version)
"Symphony 2000" (Instrumental)
"Right Now" (Radio Edit)
"Right Now" (LP Version)
"Right Now" (Instrumental)

Charts

Weekly charts

References

1999 singles
EPMD songs
Song recordings produced by Erick Sermon
Songs written by Erick Sermon
Songs written by Method Man
Redman (rapper) songs
Method Man songs